The Modern English Version (MEV) is an English translation of the Bible begun in 2005 and completed in 2014. The work was edited by James F. Linzey, and is an update of the King James Version (KJV), re-translated from the Masoretic Text and the Textus Receptus. The ecumenical Committee on Bible Translation is composed of 47 American and English scholars from the three major branches of Christianity: Orthodox, Protestant, and Roman Catholic.

History
In June 2005, Southern Baptist minister, chief editor, and executive director Rev. James F. Linzey assembled and directed the Committee on Bible Translation, which included Stanley M. Horton serving as the senior editorial advisor. The Committee produced an updated edition of the KJV called the MEV, which is the KJV in a more modern English vernacular. The translators began the work on June 2, 2005; they completed the New Testament on October 25, 2011, and the Old Testament on May 28, 2014.

Committee members include Eugene C. Ulrich, Stephen L. Herring, Eric Mitchell, Edward W. Watson, and T.J. Betts. The scholars working on the translation represent many academic institutions as professors or graduates, including Fuller Theological Seminary, Geneva College, Harvard University, Oxford Centre for Hebrew and Jewish Studies, Southwestern Baptist Theological Seminary, University of Notre Dame, Yale University, and others; and they represent many churches across a wide range of denominations, including the Church of England, Evangelical Lutheran Church in America, General Council of the Assemblies of God, Presbyterian Church of America, Southern Baptist Convention, and others.

Translation philosophy

The Committee re-translated the Textus Receptus and the Jacob ben Hayyim edition of the Masoretic Text, using the KJV as a reference. The translators adhered to the principle of formal equivalence.

References

2014 books
Bible translations into English
2014 in Christianity